Movement is the first studio album by American electronic musician Holly Herndon, released by RVNG Intl. on 12 November 2012. A music video for the album's title track was uploaded to the RVNG Intl. YouTube account on 29 November 2012.

Track listing

References

External links
RVNG Intl. page

2012 debut albums
Holly Herndon albums